Wonderland Eurasia, previously known as Ankapark, was an amusement park in Ankara, Turkey. Opened in 2019, the park had 17 roller coasters, the second-most worldwide. It was closed permanently in February 2020.

History 
In 2013, the 27th mayor of Ankara, Melih Gökçek, requested name suggestions for a new amusement park that would be located on the Atatürk Forest Farm and Zoo's land, land bequeathed by Turkey’s founder, Mustafa Kemal Atatürk. On 10 July 2014, work was halted initially by the 14th Chamber Council of State due to concerns on tarnishing the legacy of the land. In December 2014, work was halted again by the Administrative Court of Ankara over the land usage. By May 2015, a roller coaster and ferris wheel were tested and opened to the public. An overpass to the park was under construction in September 2016.

By August 2017, the park was nearly complete. In October 2017, construction started on an underpass to allow easier access to the park. In November 2017, the total project had incurred a cost of 2 billion TL according to the 28th mayor of Ankara, Mustafa Tuna. In September 2018, GBM Ticaret-Çelik acquired the lease to the park for 29 years. In January 2019, it was announced that the park would open on 25 March 2019 after its certifications were completed. The park was given the new name of Wonderland Eurasia ahead of its opening, with the announcement by Turkey's President Recep Tayyip Erdoğan stating that the park would open earlier. On 20 March 2019, the park opened to the public. It closed permanently in February 2020 due to low visitor numbers. The park had cost a total of more than US$801 million, according to the Ankara Metropolitan Municipality.

In July 2022, the Ankara Metropolitan Municipality acquired the park following a court ruling. Afterward, the Ankara Metropolitan Municipality surveyed Ankara residents on how the park's site should be used. The survey showed that Ankara residents wanted the site to be redeveloped into a green area.

List of attractions 
As of January 2019, there were 17 roller coasters constructed for the park. It tied with Cedar Point and Canada's Wonderland for the third-most in the world behind Energylandia which has 18, and Six Flags Magic Mountain, which has 20.

References 

2019 establishments in Turkey
Amusement parks in Turkey
Defunct amusement parks
Amusement parks opened in 2019
Tourist attractions in Ankara